Jason Stryker is a fictional supervillain appearing in American comic books published by Marvel Comics. He is usually depicted as the mutant son of William Stryker and an enemy of the X-Men.

Publication history

Created by writer Chris Claremont and artist Brent Anderson, he first appeared in Marvel Graphic Novel #5 (1983). His character was later re-introduced in All-New X-Men #19 (2013) and was officially given his name "Jason Stryker" in that version.

Fictional character biography
At the time Jason's mother, Marcy Stryker, got pregnant, his father William was still a colonel and stationed on a nuclear testing facility. After the couple crashed their car in the Nevada desert, Marcy went into labor, forcing Stryker to deliver their baby. Marcy fell unconscious in the process and, upon waking up, she asked if the baby was fine, only for William to snap her neck. William saw his son's birth as a sign from God, causing him to turn into a religious fanatic that ensures the genocide of all mutants. However, Jason was kept alive and Stryker resorted to A.I.M. to treat his son's mutant condition.

As an adult, Jason joined the Purifiers to continue his father's work and faced the original X-Men's time-displaced version. Jason was defeated and arrested by S.H.I.E.L.D.

Powers and abilities
Jason Stryker possesses the ability to project a blinding white light from his body that is powerful enough to knock several people unconscious. His mutation was apparently initially unstable, as he was born horribly deformed and was also implied by his father to be deathly ill, afflictions that A.I.M. was able to somehow alleviate, though with side-effects such as chronic headaches and insomnia.

Other versions

Ultimate Marvel
The Ultimate Marvel iteration of the character is Reverend William Stryker, Jr., the son of William Stryker, Sr. and the leader of an anti-mutant coalition armed with Sentinel technology that is possibly stolen from S.H.I.E.L.D. He has a Sentinel tech body armor that resembles Ahab from the mainstream Marvel universe and various alternate realities. His wife Kate Stryker and son John Stryker are killed during the "Ultimatum" wave through New York, leading to his hatred against mutants. His forces (that wears Crusader-esque outfits) later attack Juggernaut and Rogue. He is later seen with the advanced Nimrod Sentinels. When he attacks Times Square, executing mutants in public, the X-Men appear and the Shroud kills him via a phasing arm through his abdomen; it's revealed that he's a mutant with the power of technopathy. His father used medication in order to suppress his abilities but his powers manifest with his last breath and manipulate a wave of Nimrod Sentinels to kill every mutant on the planet. It is revealed that his last act left his brain-patterns imprinted on the Nimrod Sentinels as Master Mold, and continues to be a threat to the X-Men. Stryker led an assault against Kitty Pryde's team of mutants before Pryde managed to damage Stryker's machine body enough to destroy him permanently.

In other media

Film
 Jason Stryker appears in X2, portrayed by Michael Reid McKay. This version is a mutant with the ability to project illusions into people's minds. Years ago, he was sent  to the Xavier institute in hopes of curing him, which only angered his father when he was told there was no cure. One year after Jason returned, he blamed his parents for being a mutant and then tortured the two by planting telepathic illusions until his mother committed suicide by drilling into her own brain. William Stryker then gave his son a lobotomy to make him more docile. As Mutant 143, he is a wheelchair user and cannot speak, and is used by his own father to make a secretion from his son's brain to administer to other mutants to control them. Administration is via drops dripped onto the back of the neck, which leaves a telltale scar. Stryker uses the secretion on Nightcrawler, Lady Deathstrike and Magneto. Stryker's control over his son was powerful; all that needed to be done is whisper commands to Jason and the action would follow without question. He uses telepathic illusionary powers to appear as a little girl (played by Keely Purvis) and is strong enough to convince Professor X to use Cerebro back at the Xavier institute. His little girl illusion has Professor X locate 'all the mutants' around the world via Cerebro. When the X-Men began an assault on Stryker's secret lair at Alkali Lake, Stryker commands Jason to use the illusion to urge the Professor to find and kill all the mutants. However, Mystique, impersonating Stryker, commands Jason to change the target to all the humans. Jason was last seen inside the replica Cerebro chamber and gets left to drown when the Weapon X underground complex was flooded by Alkali Lake.
 Jason Stryker makes a cameo appearance in X-Men Origins: Wolverine, set decades prior to the events of X2. He is kept in cryogenic suspension and is a driving force behind his father's inhumane mutant projects that eventually results in Weapon XI.

Video games
 Jason Stryker appears in X-Men: The Official Game, voiced by Steve Blum (as an adult) and by Grey DeLisle (as a child). Set several months after the events of the film X2, the game reveals that Jason survived the flooding of the Weapon X underground complex and that his psyche is now fractured into two halves: a good half who has been appearing to Nightcrawler and an evil half that is behind Master Mold's control and is trying to kill the X-Men. Jason's good half helps Nightcrawler to disable Master Mold, whereupon Nightcrawler attempts to save Jason, but Sabretooth abducts him and tries to escape. Wolverine stops and fights Sabretooth, while Nightcrawler leaves with Jason, but he dies soon after, while thanking Nightcrawler for saving him.

References

External links
 Jason Stryker at Marvel.com

Characters created by Chris Claremont
Comics characters introduced in 1982
Fictional characters who can manipulate light
Fictional colonels
Fictional cult leaders
Fictional mass murderers
Marvel Comics cyborgs
Marvel Comics undead characters
Superhero film characters